Green Apple may refer to:

Green apples
List of apple cultivars
Granny Smith, a popular green cultivar of apple

Other uses
Green Apple Books & Music, a bookstore in San Francisco, U.S.
Green Apple Music & Arts Festival, an American festival
Mrs. Green Apple, a Japanese band

See also

Green Apple Quick Step, an American band